The late 1970s–early 1980s period in the United Kingdom introduced a movement of young musicians, generally identified as the new wave of British heavy metal (often abbreviated as NWOBHM). The movement spawned more than a thousand hard rock and heavy metal bands from all over the UK, which were more or less forcibly identified as heavy metal acts. Most of those bands did not survive past the mid-1980s and disbanded, but many reformed in the 2000s.

A
Alkatrazz

Angel Witch
Atomkraft
A II Z
Avenger

B

Baby Tuckoo
Battleaxe
Battlezone
Black Rose
Blitzkrieg
Bronz

C
Charlie ’Ungry
Chateaux
Chrome Molly
Cloven Hoof

D

Dedringer
Deep Machine
Def Leppard
Demon
Diamond Head
Di'Anno
Dragonslayer
Dumpy's Rusty Nuts

E

E. F. Band
Elixir
Ethel the Frog

F
Fist

G

Girl
Girlschool

Gogmagog
Grand Prix
Grim Reaper

H
The Handsome Beasts
Haze
Hell
HellsBelles
Hollow Ground
Holocaust

I

Iron Maiden

J
Jaguar
Jameson Raid

L
Lionheart

M
Mama's Boys
Marseille
McCoy
Mirage
More
Motörhead
Mournblade

N
The Next Band
Nicky Moore Band
Nightwing

P

Pagan Altar
Persian Risk
Pet Hate
Praying Mantis

Q
Quartz

R
Race Against Time

Raven
Rock Goddess
Rogue Male

S

Salem
Samson
Saracen
Satan
Savage
Saxon
Shy
Spider
Stampede
Starfighters
Stratus
Sweet Savage

T
Tank
Terraplane
Thunderstick
Tigertailz
Tobruk
Tokyo Blade
Tredegar
Trespass
Tygers of Pan Tang
Tytan

U
Urchin

V

Vardis
Venom

W
White Spirit
Wild Horses
Witchfinder General
Witchfynde
Wrathchild

See also
New wave of American heavy metal

Notes

References

British heavy metal musical groups